Standard frequency and time signal-satellite service  (short: SFTSS) is, according to Article 1.54 of the International Telecommunication Union's (ITU) Radio Regulations (RR), defined as A radiocommunication service using space stations on earth satellites for the same purposes as those of the standard frequency and time signal service.

An example to this were experiments of time synchronisation (Global Transmission Services GTS-2) onboard International Space Station. However, in accordance to the ubiquitous availability, GNSS-satellite signals will be used in practice (see also: GPS disciplined oscillator).

Classification
In accordance with ITU Radio Regulations (article 1) variations of this radiocommunication service are classified as follows:
Standard frequency and time signal service (article 1.53)
 Standard frequency and time signal-satellite service

Examples of use 
The National Physical Laboratory, India is the premier research laboratory in India in the field of physical sciences. NPLI continues to disseminate standard time and frequency signals (STFS) via geostationary satellite INSAT with an accuracy of 10 ms.

Frequency allocation
The allocation of radio frequencies is provided according to Article 5 of the ITU Radio Regulations (edition 2012).

In order to improve harmonisation in spectrum utilisation, the majority of service-allocations stipulated in this document were incorporated in national Tables of Frequency Allocations and Utilisations which is with-in the responsibility of the appropriate national administration. The allocation might be primary, secondary, exclusive, and shared.
primary allocation:  is indicated by writing in capital letters (see example below)
secondary allocation: is indicated by small letters (see example below)

 Example of frequency allocation

References

External links 
 International Telecommunication Union (ITU)

Radiocommunication services ITU